Tutshill for Beachley Halt was a request stop on the South Wales Railway (now known as the Gloucester to Newport Line) and Wye Valley Railway. It was opened on 9 July 1934, and was intended to serve the nearby village of Tutshill. However, though the station was situated a short distance from the junction of the Wye Valley Railway and was still on the main line, the only trains which served the small halt were from the Wye Valley Railway and when the line closed on 5 January 1959, the stop closed with it.

The station was built nearby to the site of Chepstow East Station, temporarily opened between 1851 and 1852.

References

Disused railway stations in Gloucestershire
Former Great Western Railway stations
Railway stations in Great Britain opened in 1934
Railway stations in Great Britain closed in 1959
Chepstow
Tidenham